Guillaume Marchand (born 5 June 1998) is a French rugby union player. His position is hooker and he currently plays for Lyon in the Top 14.

Personal life
Marchand is the younger brother of Julien Marchand, who plays with Stade Toulousain as a hooker.

Honours

Club 
 Toulouse
Top 14: 2018–19

International 
 France (U20)
Six Nations Under 20s Championship: 2018
World Rugby Under 20 Championship: 2018

References

External links
Lyon OU profile
L'Équipe profile

1998 births
Living people
French rugby union players
Stade Toulousain players
Rugby union hookers
Lyon OU players
People from Saint-Gaudens, Haute-Garonne
Sportspeople from Haute-Garonne